Mirza Athar Baig is a Pakistani novelist, playwright and short story writer. He was born in Sharaqpur, Punjab. Both his parents were schoolteachers and encouraged him to read widely from a young age. He is currently associated with the Department of Philosophy, at Government College University in Lahore. His fiction works include three novels, a short story collection, and numerous plays for television.He is interested in landmark places in Pakistan specially old.

His first novel, Ghulam Bagh (Slave Garden), is considered one of the central works of literature in the Urdu language. The novel is very popular in Pakistan and has also received critical acclaim. Five editions have been published since its initial publication in 2006.

In addition to Ghulam Bagh, a collection of Baig's short stories, titled Beh Afsana (Anti-Story) was published in 2008. His second novel, Sifar se aik tak (From zero to one) was published in 2010. In July 2010, DAWN newspaper published a review of Sifar se aik tak  commenting on its popularity with the youth, which Baig's literature is reputed to enjoy in general.

His third novel, Hassan Ki Surat-e-Hal, was published in 2014 and has received critical acclaim in Pakistan as well as in international media. It was translated into English, and the translation received favourable reviews. In Hasan Ki Surat-e-Hal, Baig experiments with different narrative structures. He uses surrealist and poststructuralist theories and techniques to expand the formal limits of the Urdu novel. He has been credited with introducing postmodernism to Urdu literature by literary critics, but his own assessment of this topic is rather different: "Generally, I don’t say much when labelled as ‘post-modern’ because I consider it as a naïve and simplistic categorisation. The ‘modernity’ we have in our parts of the world is a vastly different socio-historical process than western modernity, out of which the so called post-modernity evolved. What sort of ‘post-modernity’ would bloom out of our ‘modernity’? Something is laughable about it but a lot is poignantly serious." The book's formal experimentations arise from Baig's belief in states of wonder as central to philosophy as well as literature.

Works

Novels
Ghulam Bagh
Sifr se aik tak
Hasan Ki Surat-e-Hal

Short stories
 Beh Afsana

Drama (Serial)
Daldal
 Doosra Asmaan
 Gehray Pani
Hissar
 Rog
Khwab Tamasha
Nashaib
Yeh Azaad Log
 Pataal
 Baila (Punjabi)
 Sikar Dupair (Punjabi)
 Akhri Show (Punjabi)

Long Play
 Catwalk
 Lafz Ayina Hai Dhund Mein Raasta Bewazan Log''

References

Living people
Pakistani novelists
Pakistani dramatists and playwrights
1950 births
Government College University, Lahore alumni